The 2010 Australian Open was a tennis tournament that took place in Melbourne Park in Melbourne, Australia, from 18 to 31 January. It was the 98th edition of the Australian Open, and the first Grand Slam event of the year.

In the singles competition, Rafael Nadal and Serena Williams were the defending champions. Williams was able to retain her title with a win over Justine Henin, 6–4, 3–6, 6–2 in the final, while Nadal retired in his quarterfinals match against Andy Murray owing to a quadriceps injury. Roger Federer was the men's champion, defeating finalist Andy Murray in straight sets 6–3, 6–4, 7–6(11).

In doubles, the 2009 champion pairs were successful in their respective title defenses – Bob and Mike Bryan in men's doubles and Serena and Venus Williams in women's doubles. Sania Mirza and Mahesh Bhupathi were not able to defend their mixed doubles title because they withdrew from the event beforehand. In mixed doubles, Cara Black and Leander Paes won the title, which made a mixed doubles career grand slam for Black.

Point distribution 

Below is a series of tables for each of the competitions showing the ranking points on offer for each event.

Senior

Wheelchair

Junior

Singles players 

Men's singles

Women's singles

Day-by-day summaries

Seniors

Men's singles 

 Roger Federer defeated  Andy Murray, 6–3, 6–4, 7–6(13–11)
 This was Federer's first title of the year and his 62nd overall. It was his 16th career Grand Slam title, and his 4th Australian Open title tying Andre Agassi for most Australian Open titles in the Open Era (Novak Djokovic later surpassed this record winning his 6th title in 2016, while Federer won the title for a 6th time in 2018). This was Federer's 5th final at the Australian Open which tied him with Stefan Edberg for the Open Era record.

Women's singles 

 Serena Williams defeated  Justine Henin, 6–4, 3–6, 6–2

This was Williams's first title of the year, a record 5th Australian Open title in the Open Era. The title was Williams' 12th major title, which tied her for 6th all-time with Billie Jean King and Suzanne Lenglen, and in the Open Era solo 4th having surpassed Court's 11 mark, which Williams' is behind Graf (22), Evert and Navratilova with (18) each.

Men's doubles 

 Bob Bryan /  Mike Bryan defeated  Daniel Nestor /  Nenad Zimonjić, 6–3, 6–7(5–7), 6–3

This was the Bryan brothers' 57th doubles title together, 4th Australian Open title, and 8th major title.

Women's doubles 

 Serena Williams /  Venus Williams defeated  Cara Black /  Liezel Huber, 6–4, 6–3

 This is the Williams Sisters' 11th Grand Slam doubles title together and 4th Australian Open title.

Mixed doubles 

 Cara Black /  Leander Paes defeated  Ekaterina Makarova /  Jaroslav Levinský, 7–5, 6–3

This was the pair's 3rd consecutive grand slam final and the 4th overall. The victory makes Paes India's joint-lead grand slam winner alongside his ex- doubles partner Mahesh Bhupathi with a total of 11 grand slam doubles titles. This title gave Black a career mixed doubles grand slam, which Black has won one of each slam in mixed doubles.

Juniors

Boys' singles 

 Tiago Fernandes defeated  Sean Berman, 7-6 (7-5), 6–3

Girls' singles 

 Karolína Plíšková defeated  Laura Robson, 6–1, 7–6(5)

Boys' doubles 

 Justin Eleveld /  Jannick Lupescu defeated  Kevin Krawietz /  Dominik Schulz, 6–4, 6–4

Girls' doubles 

 Jana Čepelová /  Chantal Škamlová defeated  Tímea Babos /  Gabriela Dabrowski, 7–6(1), 6–2

Other events

Wheelchair men's singles 

 Shingo Kunieda defeated  Stéphane Houdet, 7–6(3), 2–6, 7–5

Wheelchair women's singles 

 Korie Homan defeated  Florence Gravellier, 6–2, 6–2

Wheelchair quad singles 

 Peter Norfolk defeated  David Wagner, 6–2, 7–6(4)

Wheelchair men's doubles 

 Stéphane Houdet /  Shingo Kunieda defeated  Maikel Scheffers /  Robin Ammerlaan, 6–2, 6–2

Wheelchair women's doubles 

 Florence Gravellier /  Aniek Van Koot defeated  Lucy Shuker /  Daniela Di Toro, 6–3, 7–6(2)

Wheelchair quad doubles 

 Nicholas Taylor /  David Wagner defeated  Peter Norfolk /  Johan Andersson, 6–2, 7–6(5)

Singles seeds

Men's singles

Women's singles

Wildcard entries

Men's singles wildcard entries 
  Carsten Ball
  Andrey Golubev
  Sébastien Grosjean
  Ryan Harrison
  Jason Kubler
  Nick Lindahl
  Marinko Matosevic
  Bernard Tomic

Women's singles wildcard entries 
  Stéphanie Cohen-Aloro
  Casey Dellacqua
  Jarmila Groth
  Justine Henin
  Sesil Karatancheva
  Alicia Molik
  Olivia Rogowska
  CoCo Vandeweghe

Men's doubles wildcard entries 
  Marinko Matosevic /  Bernard Tomic
  Prakash Amritraj /  Somdev Devvarman
  Kaden Hensel /  Greg Jones
  Matthew Ebden /  Brydan Klein
  Rameez Junaid /  Peter Luczak
  Nick Lindahl /  Matt Reid
  Samuel Groth /  Jason Kubler

Women's doubles wildcard entries 
  Shannon Golds /  Marija Mirkovic
  Yayuk Basuki /  Kimiko Date-Krumm
  Sally Peers /  Laura Robson
  Jarmila Groth /  Olivia Rogowska
  Monique Adamczak /  Nicole Kriz
  Alicia Molik /  Meghann Shaughnessy
  Sophie Ferguson /  Jessica Moore

Mixed doubles wildcard entries 
  Sophie Ferguson /  Carsten Ball
  Carly Gullickson /  Bernard Tomic
  Sally Peers /  Peter Luczak
  Alicia Molik /  Matthew Ebden
  Anastasia Rodionova /  Paul Hanley
  Jarmila Groth /  Samuel Groth
  Casey Dellacqua /  Jordan Kerr

Protected ranking 
The following players were accepted directly into the main draw using a protected ranking: 

Men's singles
  Robin Haase
  Carlos Moyá
  Kristof Vliegen

Women's singles
  Marina Erakovic
  Tamira Paszek

Qualifiers entries

Men's qualifiers entries 

  Xavier Malisse
  Matthew Ebden
  Grega Žemlja
  Antonio Veić
  Louk Sorensen
  Guillaume Rufin
  Ricardo Hocevar
  Donald Young
  Illya Marchenko
  Ivan Sergeyev
  Kevin Anderson
  Blaž Kavčič
  Ivan Dodig
  David Guez
  Stefan Koubek
  Dieter Kindlmann

The following players received lucky loser spots in the men's draw:
  Marsel İlhan

Women's qualifiers entries 

  Yanina Wickmayer
  Regina Kulikova
  Shenay Perry
  Han Xinyun
  Renata Voráčová
  Sofia Arvidsson
  Angelique Kerber
  Yvonne Meusburger
  Yuliana Fedak
  Zuzana Kučová
  Valérie Tétreault
  Kathrin Wörle

Withdrawals 

Men's singles
  Mario Ančić → replaced by  Igor Kunitsyn
  Andreas Beck → replaced by  Robin Haase
  Máximo González → replaced by  Santiago Giraldo
  Xavier Malisse → replaced by  Jan Hájek
  Paul-Henri Mathieu → replaced by  Teymuraz Gabashvili
  David Nalbandian → replaced by  Stéphane Robert
  Gilles Simon → replaced by  Marsel İlhan
  Dmitry Tursunov → replaced by  Wayne Odesnik

Women's singles
  Anne Keothavong → replaced by  Pauline Parmentier
  Patty Schnyder → replaced by  Anastasiya Yakimova

Point distribution

Prize money 
All prize money is in Australian dollars (A$); doubles prize money is distributed per pair.

Men's and women's singles 
 Winners: $2,200,168
 Runners-up: $1,050,000
 Semi-finalists: $400,000
 Quarter-finalists: $200,000
 Fourth round: $89,000
 Third round: $52,000
 Second round: $31,500
 First round: $19,500

Men's and women's doubles 
 Winners: $450,000
 Runners-up: $225,000
 Semi-finalists: $112,000
 Quarter-finalists: $55,400
 Third round: $31,245
 Second round: $17,035
 First round: $9,585

Mixed doubles 
 Winners: $134,460
 Runners-up: $67,230
 Semi-finalists: $33,615
 Quarter-finalists: $15,490
 Second round: $7,745
 First round: $3,755

References

External links 

 

 
 

 
2010 in Australian tennis
2010 ATP World Tour
2010 WTA Tour
January 2010 sports events in Australia
2010,Australian Open